Petar Kralj (4 April 1941 – 10 November 2011) was a Serbian theater, film and television actor.

Biography

Kralj was born in Zagreb to a Serb family from Banija. During World War II his family fled to Syrmia, where he grew up. He graduated from a gymnasium in Novi Sad and studied acting at the University of Arts in Belgrade. He started his acting career at Atelje 212 theater. Kralj had appeared on stage about 3,000 times, and starred in over 200 films, TV series and TV films gaining huge popularity as one of the most recognizable Serbian actors. In December 2000, he was ranked eighth in the Serbian newspaper Večernje novosti in the "Best Serbian Actors and Actresses of the 20th Century" list. In 2005, he played lead role in first Serbian science fiction television series The Collector.

He died in Belgrade, aged 70.

References

External links

 

1941 births
2011 deaths
Male actors from Zagreb
Serbs of Croatia
Serbian male film actors
Serbian male television actors
Miloš Žutić Award winners
Laureates of the Ring of Dobrica
Burials at Belgrade New Cemetery